Nilmar Oskar Charles Janbu (23 August 1921 – 4 January 2013) was a Norwegian engineer and geotechnician.

He was born in Fræna. He graduated in civil engineering from the Norwegian Institute of Technology in 1947, and in geotechnics from Harvard University in 1949. His dr. thesis from 1954 was titled Stability analysis of slopes with dimensionless parameters. He was appointed professor of geotechnics at the Norwegian Institute of Technology from 1961. He was Rankine Lecturer 1985, discussing solutions to problems in offshore engineering.

He died in 2013.

References

1921 births
2013 deaths
People from Fræna
Norwegian engineers
Norwegian Institute of Technology alumni
Harvard University alumni
Academic staff of the Norwegian Institute of Technology
Members of the Norwegian Academy of Technological Sciences